The 2018 Southeast Sulawesi gubernatorial election took place on 27 June 2018 as part of the simultaneous local elections. It was held to elect the governor of Southeast Sulawesi along with their deputy, whilst members of the provincial council (Dewan Perwakilan Rakyat Daerah) will be re-elected in 2019.

Former governor Ali Mazi came out on top of the three-candidate race, defeating former Kendari mayor Asrun and North Kolaka regent Rusda Mahmud.

Timeline
Registration for party-backed candidates were opened between 8 and 10 January 2018, while independent candidates were required to register between 22 and 26 November 2017. The candidates were assigned their ballot numbers on 13 February 2018. The campaigning period would commence between 15 February and 24 June, with a three-day election silence before voting on 27 June. In May 2018, KPU declared that there were 1,628,320 eligible voters for the election.

Candidates

Results

References 

2018 Indonesian gubernatorial elections
Southeast Sulawesi